Emmy Award for Best Lead Actor in a Drama may refer to the following Emmy Awards:

 Primetime Emmy Award for Outstanding Lead Actor in a Drama Series
 Daytime Emmy Award for Outstanding Lead Actor in a Drama Series
 International Emmy Award for Best Actor

Emmy Awards